Maxates sinuolata is a moth in the family Geometridae. It was first described by Inoue in 1989. It is found in Taiwan.

References

Moths described in 1989
Hemitheini